John Dyer (born 6 February 1992 in Fiji) is a Fijian rugby union player who plays for  in the Top 14. His playing position is flanker. He made his debut for Fiji in 2019 against the Māori All Blacks.

Reference list

External links
 

1992 births
Fijian rugby union players
Fiji international rugby union players
Living people
Rugby union flankers
Fijian Drua players
Racing 92 players
Biarritz Olympique players